William Hand may refer to:
William Hand (yacht designer), yacht designer
Black Hand (comics), DC Comics character
William Brevard Hand (1924–2008), U.S. federal judge
Bill Hand (William R. Hand, 1898–?), English footballer

See also
William Hands, English cricketer